Everybody Knows may refer to:

Film and television
 Everybody Knows (film), a 2018 Spanish thriller film
 Everybody Knows, a 2008 TV documentary about Leonard Cohen; also a 2014 concert video by Cohen; see Leonard Cohen discography

Music

Albums
 Everybody Knows (Prairie Oyster album) or the title song (see below), 1991
 Everybody Knows (Sonia album) or the title song, 1990
 Everybody Knows (Stills & Collins album), by Stephen Stills and Judy Collins, 2017
 Everybody Knows (Trisha Yearwood album) or the title song (see below), 1996
 Everybody Knows (The Young Gods album), 2010
 Everybody Knows (EP), by Ryan Adams, UK title of Follow the Lights, or the title song (see below), 2007
 Everybody Knows, by the Dave Clark Five, or the title song (see below), 1967
 Everybody Knows, by Sharon Robinson, 2008

Songs
 "Everybody Knows" (Dave Clark Five song), 1967 (see below for their 1964 song)
 "Everybody Knows" (Dixie Chicks song), 2006
 "Everybody Knows" (John Legend song), 2009
 "Everybody Knows" (Leonard Cohen song), 1988
 "Everybody Knows" (Prairie Oyster song), 1992
 "Everybody Knows" (Trisha Yearwood song), 1996
 "Everybody Knows", by Chris Brown from Heartbreak on a Full Moon, 2017
 "Everybody Knows", by Edison Lighthouse, 1971
 "Everybody Knows', by Idina Menzel from Idina, 2016
 "Everybody Knows", by Ivy from All Hours, 2011
 "Everybody Knows", by James from Laid, 1993
 "Everybody Knows", by Janis Ian from The Secret Life of J. Eddy Fink, 1968
 "Everybody Knows", by Kids of 88 from Sugarpills, 2010
 "Everybody Knows", by Kimbra from Primal Heart, 2018
 "Everybody Knows", by McFly from Radio:Active, 2008
 "Everybody Knows", by Ryan Adams from Easy Tiger, 2007
 "Everybody Knows", by the Wanted from Word of Mouth, 2013
 "Everybody Knows", by Westlife, a B-side of the single "Swear It Again", 1999
 "Everybody Knows (Except You)", by the Divine Comedy from A Short Album About Love, 1997
 "Everybody Knows (I Still Love You)", by the Dave Clark Five from Coast to Coast, 1964

See also
 Common knowledge